Geovibrio is a Gram-negative, non-spore-forming, strictly anaerobic and motile genus of bacteria from the family of Deferribacteraceae.

References

Further reading 
 
 
 

Deferribacterota
Bacteria genera